Emmons Glacier is on the northeast flank of Mount Rainier, in Washington. At , it has the largest surface area of any glacier in the contiguous United States. The glacier was named after the geologist Samuel Franklin Emmons after his involvement in a survey of Mount Rainier in 1870.

The glaciers flow together and remain connected until they split up upon reaching the wedge of Little Tahoma Peak.

In the 1930s, the glacier was found to be receding quickly. In 1963, however, a rock fall from Little Tahoma Peak covered the lower glacier with rock debris. The debris cover insulated the ice from melting. As a result of decreased melting, the glacier advanced rapidly in the early 1980s. That advance was continuing by 1992, but at a slower rate; ice beneath the rock debris was melting irregularly and forming a vast hummocky area. By 2003, the glacier was again retreating. "In the past few decades the glaciers [in the American West] have been receding, continuing a trend from the Little Ice Age."

Emmons Glacier is often used as a route (the Columbia Crest route) to climb to the summit of Mount Rainier. There is a Ranger Station at Camp Schurman that was established on the edge of the Steamboat Prow.

See also
List of glaciers in the United States

References 

Glaciers of Mount Rainier
Glaciers of Washington (state)